The Iranian shrew (Crocidura susiana) is a species of mammal in the family Soricidae. It is endemic to Iran.  It is threatened by habitat loss.

References

Sources
Insectivore Specialist Group 1996. Crocidura susiana. 2006 IUCN Red List of Threatened Species. Downloaded on 30 July 2007.

Shrew, Iranian
Crocidura
Endemic fauna of Iran
Mammals described in 1978
Taxonomy articles created by Polbot